Shah Moazzem Hossain (known as SM Hossain; 10 January 1939 – 14 September 2022) was a Bangladesh Nationalist Party politician and the last Deputy Prime Minister of Bangladesh. He was elected as the Jatiya Sangsad member representing the Rangpur-6 constituency as a Jatiya Party candidate in a by-election in September 1991 and served until November 1995.

Career
Hossain was active in student politics. He served as the whip of the 1972 Bangladesh Awami League government headed by Sheikh Mujibur Rahman. He was a minister in the cabinet of Khondaker Mostaq Ahmad.

He was elected to Parliament from Rangpur-6 as a Jatiya Party candidate in a by-election in September 1991. The by-elections were called after Hussain Mohammad Ershad, who had won five seats including Rangpur-6, chose to resign and represent Rangpur-3.

He joined Jatiya Party led by Hussain Mohammad Ershad but was removed from the party in 1992. He joined Bangladesh Nationalist Party afterwards. He served as Vice-Chairman of Bangladesh Nationalist Party until death.

References

1939 births
2022 deaths
People from Rangpur District
Bangladesh Nationalist Party politicians
Deputy Prime Ministers of Bangladesh
1st Jatiya Sangsad members
5th Jatiya Sangsad members
Bangladesh Krishak Sramik Awami League central committee members
Place of birth missing